is a Japanese actress and voice actress. She was previously affiliated with Hirata Office, but is currently affiliated with Toy's Factory.

Biography
In 2011, she made her debut as Sora Matsuzaki in the anime movie From Up on Poppy Hill.

Filmography

Television
Kakko Kawaii Senken! (2012), Class President, Risu, Tori
Sengoku Collection (2012), Yoshitsugu Ōtani
Glass no Kamen Desu ga (2013), Ayumi Himekawa
My Youth Romantic Comedy Is Wrong, As I Expected (2013), Mori-chan
Ronja, the Robber's Daughter (2014), Ronja
Mushishi: The Next Chapter (2014), Masumi
Himouto! Umaru-chan (2015–2017), Kirie Motoba
Anne Happy (2016), Ruri "Hibari" Hibarigaoka
Action Heroine Cheer Fruits (2017), Kanon Shimura
A Centaur's Life (2017), Kyōko Naraku
Tsuki ga Kirei (2017), Aoi Takizawa
Golden Kamuy (2018–present), Asirpa
Uchi no Maid ga Uzasugiru! (2018), Misha Takanashi
Anima Yell! (2018), Kana Ushiku
That Time I Got Reincarnated as a Slime (2019), Alice
We Never Learn (2019), Fumino Furuhashi
Hachigatsu no Cinderella Nine (2019), Kana Tsukumo
Oresuki (2019), Aoi "Himawari" Hinata
Tenka Hyakken ~Meiji-kan e Yōkoso!~ (2019), Nanaka
Healin' Good PreCure (2020), Latte, Hamtus
Sakura Wars: The Animation (2020), Leyla M. Ruzhkova
The Misfit of Demon King Academy (2020), Nono Inota
Dropout Idol Fruit Tart (2020), Hayu Nukui
WIXOSS Diva(A)Live (2021), Rei Sakigake
86 (2021), Kaie Tanya
Peach Boy Riverside (2021), Sally/Saltherine Aldarake
World's End Harem (2021–22), Mira Suō, Elisa Tachibana
The Strongest Sage With the Weakest Crest (2022), Alma
Akebi's Sailor Uniform (2022), Mai Togano
Shinobi no Ittoki (2022), Kōsetsu
The Eminence in Shadow (2022), Rose Oriana
Play It Cool, Guys (2022), Momo Momosaki
Mobile Suit Gundam: The Witch from Mercury (2022), Nika Nanaura (episode 10 onwards)
High Card (2023), Wendy Satō
Reborn to Master the Blade: From Hero-King to Extraordinary Squire (2023), Eris
The Angel Next Door Spoils Me Rotten (2023), Chitose Shirakawa
My One-Hit Kill Sister (2023), Maya Ikusaba
Dead Mount Death Play (2023), Saki Aikawa
Helck (2023), Isuta
The Idolmaster Shiny Colors (2024), Chiyoko Sonoda

Original net animation
A.I.C.O. -Incarnation- (2018), Aiko Tachibana
High-Rise Invasion (2021), Yuri Honjō

Original video animation
Oresuki: Oretachi no Game Set (2020), Aoi "Himawari" Hinata

Film
From Up On Poppy Hill (2011), Sora Matsuzaki 
Glass no Kamen Desu ga Onna Spy no Koi! Murasaki no Bara wa Kiken na Kaori!? (2013), Ayumi Himekawa
When Marnie Was There (2014), Miyoko
Cyborg 009 Vs. Devilman (2015), Cyborg 001/Ivan Whisky
Flavors of Youth (2018), Lulu
Blue Thermal (2022), Yukari Muroi

Video games
Himouto! Umaru-chan: Himōto! Ikusei Keikaku (2015), Kirie Motoba
Racing Musume (2015), Asuna Ban
Yome Collection (2016), Kirie Motoba
Girl Friend Beta (2017), Fuuka Mizuno
Schoolgirl Strikers (2018), Sui Hayasaka
The Idolmaster Shiny Colors (2018–present), Chiyoko Sonoda
Azur Lane (2018), Le Malin, Agano, Blücher
Alice Gear Aegis (2018), Nina Kalinina
Another Eden (2019), Veina
Girls' Frontline (2020), Steyr ACR & VHS 
Arknights (2020), Iris
League of Legends (2022), Zeri 
Honkai Impact 3rd (2022), Aponia
Massage Freaks (2022), Shiho Asagiri
Goddess of Victory: Nikke (2022), Folkwang, Rupee
 Lackgirl I (2022), Izumi

Dubbing

Live-action
Find Me in Paris, Thea Raphael
Enola Holmes, Enola Holmes

Animation
Finding Dory, Abbey

References

External links
 

1995 births
Living people
Japanese musical theatre actresses
Japanese video game actresses
Japanese voice actresses
Voice actresses from Tokyo